Francis Griffith Newlands Memorial Fountain is a historic fountain located at Chevy Chase Circle, on the border between the Chevy Chase neighborhood, Northwest, Washington, D.C., and the community of Chevy Chase, Maryland. The fountain was designed by Edward W. Donn, Jr. in 1933 and erected in 1938. Named for Francis G. Newlands, the project was funded by Newlands' widow. It is controlled and operated by the National Park Service as part of nearby Rock Creek Park.

Fountain
The fountain honors Newlands, a U.S. senator and founder of Chevy Chase, Maryland. In 1902, Newland sponsored the Newlands Reclamation Act, which allowed the federal government to begin irrigation of the West. He was an outspoken white supremacist, antisemite, and segregationist who advocated the repeal of the 15th Amendment to deprive African-Americans of the right to vote. He founded the Chevy Chase Land Company, which established whites-only neighborhoods on the D.C.-Maryland border.

In 1990, the Land Company refurbished the fountain to recognize the 100th anniversary of the founding of Chevy Chase. The fountain was rededicated and recognized by the National Register of Historic Places.

Proposed renaming
In December 2014, the Chevy Chase Advisory Neighborhood Commission (ANC) considered a proposal to rename the fountain due to Newlands' white supremacist views. On December 8, the Historic Chevy Chase DC Board voted to support changing the name to Chevy Chase Fountain; a report chronicled the debate.  The descendants of Newlands opposed the renaming.  The ANC voted 4-2 (1 abstention) to table the motion and consider it later.

A bronze plaque at the fountain contained an inscription reading "His Statesmanship Held True Regard For The Interests Of All Men." In 2020, the ANC voted to have the plaque removed.

On February 23, 2021, Delegate Eleanor Holmes Norton, D-D.C., introduced a bill to require the National Park Service to rename the fountain. Designated H.R. 1256 and named the Francis G. Newlands Memorial Removal Act, it was referred to the Subcommittee on National Parks, Forests, and Public Lands of the House Natural Resources Committee on March 23, 2021. On April 19, 2022, the Montgomery County Council adopted a resolution proclaiming its support for the bill.

See also
Senator Newlands Memorial (U.S. National Park Service)
National Register of Historic Places listings in the upper NW Quadrant of Washington, D.C.

Further reading
Chevy Chase Historical Society letter (December 4, 2014)

References

External links
 Memorial index 

African-American history of Montgomery County, Maryland
African-American history of Washington, D.C.
Anti-black racism in Maryland
Anti-black racism in Washington, D.C.
Antisemitism in Maryland
Antisemitism in Washington, D.C.
Buildings and structures completed in 1938
Chevy Chase (Washington, D.C.)
Fountains in Washington, D.C.
History of racism in Maryland
History of racism in Washington, D.C.
Jews and Judaism in Montgomery County, Maryland
Jews and Judaism in Washington, D.C.
Monuments and memorials on the National Register of Historic Places in Washington, D.C.